Kabando wa Kabando (born in August, 1967) is a Kenyan politician and activist. He represented the Mukurweini Constituency in the National Assembly of Kenya for two terms having been elected for the first time in the 2007 Kenyan general election under the Safina Party which he was a member until 2022.

Education 
Kabando went to University of Nairobi and pursued Bachelor of Arts in Political Science in International Training in Corporate Governance and Leadership between 1990 and 1993. Later, he did his Masters in Public Policy & Management at State University of New York, USA between 1999-2001. In 2008, he received a Distinguished Alumnus award from SUNYSB.

Politics 
Kabando was elected as chairman of the Students Organization of Nairobi University (SONU) in 1992. Although at the time campus politics was highly tribal, Kabando was able to unite all ethnic groups together to vote for him. At around that time he changed his name  to Kabando wa Kabando to conceal his ethnicity at the period since the then president was the Chancellor to the University and he was very interested in campus leadership.

Kabando served in the Nairobi City Water Board as Chairman water management authority 2004-7. He doubled as the Chiefs Executive of Kenya Hotelkeepers Association 2003-7.

Kabando joined parliament in 2007. His first party, the Safina Party, was openly supporting the reelection of former president Mwai Kibaki in 2007. In 2013, Kabando joined The National Alliance party which was led by President Uhuru Kenyatta.

During the 2017 General Election in Kenya, Kabando contested the Jubilee Party's nomination to vie for the parliamentary seat in Mukurweini Constituency but he lost the bid and left the party to contest the parliamentary seat on an independent ticket but was again unsuccessful.

Although Kabando left the president's Jubilee Party, he continued to campaign for president Uhuru's reelection. In October 2017 he spearheaded a caucus calling for national dialogue to heal the sharply divided country. In June 2018 he again mobilized national leaders to support Building Bridges to National Unity, an initiative of President Kenyatta and Opposition Leader Raila Odinga.

In 2022, Kabando unsuccessfully run for Nyeri county senator seat.

References

Living people
The National Alliance politicians
Members of the National Assembly (Kenya)
Kikuyu people
21st-century Kenyan politicians
1967 births